Lanett is a city in Chambers County, Alabama, United States. At the 2010 census the population was 6,468, down from 7,897 in 2000. Lanett, originally called Bluffton, is located in eastern Alabama, on the Chattahoochee River, southwest of Atlanta. The city's name is derived from Lafayette Lanier and Theodore Bennett, founders of the West Point Manufacturing Company.

Geography
Lanett is located on the eastern edge of Chambers County at 32°51'48.326" North, 85°11'58.862" West (32.863424, -85.199684). Its eastern boundary is the Alabama–Georgia state line, with the town of West Point, Georgia, bordering Lanett to the east. Interstate 85 forms the southeast boundary of Lanett, with the city of Valley, Alabama, on the other side of the highway. The unincorporated community of Huguley is along Lanett's southwest border.

The Chattahoochee River forms the state line and eastern boundary of Lanett from I-85 north to the downtown area, at which point the state line turns north-northwest and becomes a land boundary between Lanett and West Point, Georgia.

Demographics

2020 census

As of the 2020 United States census, there were 6,970 people, 2,712 households, and 1,487 families residing in the city.

2010 census
As of the census of 2010, there were 6,468 people, 2,723 households, and 1,746 families residing in the city. The racial makeup of the city was 57.5% Black or African American, 39.3% White,  0.2% Native American, 0.1% Asian, 1.4% from other races, and 1.5% from two or more races. 2.4% of the population were Hispanic or Latino of any race.

There were 2,723 households, out of which 23.2% had children under the age of 18 living with them, 32.6% were married couples living together, 25.4% had a female householder with no husband present, and 35.9% were non-families. 32.1% of all households were made up of individuals, and 14.6% had someone living alone who was 65 years of age or older. The average household size was 2.34 and the average family size was 2.93.

In the city, the age distribution of the population shows 22.3% under the age of 18, 8.8% from 18 to 24, 22.6% from 25 to 44, 28.0% from 45 to 64, and 18.3% who were 65 years of age or older. The median age was 41.8 years. For every 100 females, there were 85.1 males. For every 100 females age 18 and over, there were 87.4 males.

The median income for a household in the city was $25,220, and the median income for a family was $27,487. Males had a median income of $32,386 versus $24,794 for females. The per capita income for the city was $14,178. About 22.7% of families and 28.7% of the population were below the poverty line, including 48.0% of those under age 18 and 16.8% of those age 65 or over.

Notable people

Desi Barmore (born 1960), American-Israeli basketball player
 Linton Lomas Barrett, educator, administrator, diplomat, editor, Hispanist and translator of Romance languages
 Josh Cooper, professional football defensive end
 John Copeland, former Alabama Crimson Tide All-American who played on 1992 National Champs, NFL player for the Cincinnati Bengals
 Josh Evans, former University of Alabama at Birmingham Blazer and NFL player for the Houston Oilers, Tennessee Titans and New York Jets
 Millard Fuller, founder of Habitat for Humanity, born in nearby Cusseta, graduate of Lanett High School
 Fred Hatfield, former Major League Baseball player
 Hal Herring, former Auburn University and professional football player; served as the defensive coordinator for Auburn from 1953 to 1965.
 Dave Hill, former Auburn offensive lineman; played for Kansas City Chiefs in first Super Bowl
 Bobby Hunt, former Auburn University and Kansas City Chiefs defensive back who played in the first Super Bowl
 Fob James, 48th governor of Alabama, born in Lanett
 Jimmy Johnson, cartoonist
 Walt Landers, former NFL running back
 Jesse Francis McClendon, chemist, zoologist and physiologist
 Marcus Pollard, NFL executive
 John Levi Sheppard, U.S. Representative
 Willie Sims, basketball player
 Dick Wood, former Auburn and AFL quarterback, NFL assistant coach

References

External links

City of Lanett official website

Cities in Alabama
Cities in Chambers County, Alabama
Alabama populated places on the Chattahoochee River